This Armor is the second studio album recorded by Japanese singer-songwriter Chihiro Onitsuka, released in March 2002. It features two lead singles "infection", "Ryūseigun", and remake versions of "Arrow of Pain" (B-Side of a single "Gekko" in 2000) and "Little Beat Rifle" (double A-Side to "infection").

Onitsuka described the album as "a sequel to Insomnia", her chart-topping debut which came out in 2001. Like its predecessor, the title of the album was named by the artist, simply because she liked the sound of the phrase. Cover art was taken by photographer Mika Ninagawa in Miyako-jima, Okinawa prefecture.
 
This Armor debuted and peaked at the number-three on the Japanese Oricon albums chart and remained the top-300 for 25 weeks, with estimated sales of over half a million copies. The album was certified Platinum by the Recording Industry Association of Japan upon its release, for shipments of over 400,000 units.

Track listing 
All songs arranged and produced by Takefumi Haketa.

Personnel
Credits adapted from liner notes of the album

Session musicians
Chihiro Onitsuka – vocals, composer, lyricist
Takefumi Haketa – acoustic piano, keyboards, drum programming, pad, tubular bells, background vocals; sound producer, composer (not credited on the sleeve notes)
Hiroshi Sato – wurlitzer, Hammond B-3
Takashi Nishiumi – acoustic guitar, electric guitar, dobro guitar, background vocals
Nobuyasu Horikoshi – acoustic guitar, electric guitar
Kiyotsugu Amano – gut guitar
Hitoshi Watanabe – bass guitar, contra bass
Tatsuo Hayashi – drums
Hideo Yamaki – drums
Yuichi Togashiki – drums
Ikuo Kakehashi – percussion, udu, talking drum, bell, tambourine, triangle, djembe
Marie Ohishi – timpani, suspended cymbals
Naoto – violin
Osamu Iyoku – violin
Takuya Mori – violin
Kouta Nagahara – violin
Machiya Saito – violin
Ado Matsumoto – violin
Etsuko Hara – violin
Ikuko Nakaya – violin
Jun Tajiri – violin
Koji Ohtake – violin
Hitoshi Konno – violin
Shizuka Kawaguchi – violin
Marisa Kosugi – violin
Hiroki Mutoh – violin
Yu Sugino – violin
Mariko Aikawa – violin
Yu Manabe – violin
Shoko Miki – viola
Kaori Banba – viola
Gentaro Sakaguchi – viola
Masami Horisawa – cello
Toshihiko Tsuchida – cello
Hajime Mizoguchi – cello
Akio Ueki – cello
Hiroki Kashiwagi – cello
Tomoyuki Asakawa – harp
Mari Yasui – tin whistle
Toshiko Ezaki – background vocals
Melody Little Bears – background vocals

Production
Nozomu Tsuchiya – producer
Toshihiro Hachisuka musicians coordinate
Yuya Suzuki – engineer
Shinichi Naitoh – engineer
Kanako Fukuda – engineer
Satoshi Konno – engineer
Atsuhiro Murakami – drum technician on track 2
Jiro Yamazaki – visual producer
Naomi Terakawa – visual coordinator
Miyuki Hentona – art director
Mika Ninagawa – photographer
Daisuke Iga – stylist
Eri Akamatsu – hair, make-up
Satoru Iijima – A&R manager
Kenichi Tanaka – artist manager
Kenichi Nomura – A&R director
Kosei Sasaki – A&R executive
Kumiko Himeno – A&R executive
Masaaki Saito – super executive
Junya Nakasone – super executive
Makoto Shioya – super executive
Masao Yoshida – super executive
Takaichi Motegi – super executive
Mikio Tao – artist PR
Kotaro Suzuki – artist PR
Mayu kobayashi – artist PR
Toshiba EMI Virgin Tokyo Marketing Group – media PR
Toshiba EMI Sales Promotion – sales PR

Certifications

Charts

Weekly charts

Year-end charts

External links
Official music videos

References

2002 albums
Chihiro Onitsuka albums